The Vietnam Investor Confidence Index measures the attitude of both Vietnamese local and foreign investors (investing into Vietnam stock market) to risk.

History
The index is calculated monthly since January 2007 and developed by Woori CBV Securities Corporation.

Methodology
 The index uses the principles of modern financial theory to model the underlying behavior of both domestic and foreign investors investing into Vietnam stock market. It is not survey based, but quantitative based.
 The index is weighted 50% towards selling and buying pattern of investors and 50% towards Vietnam equity market P/E ratio relative to 10 year Vietnamese Government Treasury yield.
 The index is calculated on monthly basic.

Criteria
 Vietnam Domestic Investor Confidence Index
 Vietnam Foreign Investor Confidence Index

Level
 100 point: “neutral”.
 Above 100 point: “positive” (investors are increasing their allocations to equity assets).
 Below 100 point: “negative” (investors are reducing their allocations to equity assets).

See also 

VND Index 
Vietnam Consumer Confidence Index 
Vietnam Securities Indexes 
Vietnam Bond Indexes 
Woori CBV Securities Corporation

External links
 Vietnam Investor Confidence Index on Bloomberg website
 About Woori CBV
 Vietnam Investor Confidence Index on Woori CBV
 Vneconomy about Vietnam Investor Confidence Index
 Intellasia about Vietnam Investor Confidence Index

Economic indicators
Economy of Hanoi
Economy of Vietnam